is one of the preserved throwing techniques, Habukareta Waza, of Judo. It belonged to the fifth group, Dai Gokyo, of the 1895 Gokyo no Waza lists. It is categorized as a hand throwing technique, Te-waza. It rarely occurs in competition or randori.

Yama Arashi is also one of Danzan Ryu's twenty throwing techniques of the Nagete list.

Technique description 
Graphic

Danzan Ryu's version looks more like Osoto Gari, whereas in Judo, it almost looks like a thigh sweeping throw. Since it is categorized as a hand technique, the technique must have been thought of being primarily executed by tori's arms.

Demonstration: Demonstrated

Technique history

Included systems 
Systems:
Kodokan Judo, List of Kodokan Judo techniques
Danzan Ryu, Lists of Danzan Ryu
Yama Arashi Goshin Jitsu
Lists:
The Canon Of Judo
Judo technique

Similar techniques, variants, and aliases 
English Alias: Mountain Storm

Similar techniques:

 Harai Goshi: Difference lies in the action of the leg in Harai Goshi

References 
 Ohlenkamp, Neil (2006) Judo Unleashed basic reference on judo. .
 Yamarashi (japanese)

Judo technique
Throw (grappling)